Branko Črnac – Tusta (1955–2012) was a Yugoslav-born singer, frontman of the Croatian cult punk-band KUD Idijoti.

Biography
He was born on 6 October 1955 in Pula, in a family originating from an unspecified village on the Ćićarija hill.

He graduated from Pula Technical School, and from 1978 till death he worked at Uljanik Electric Machines and Equipment Factory (TESU), where he eventually became a head of a department; he was a trade-union representative for the Trade Unions of Istria, Kvarner and Dalmatia, and he actively organized and participated in workers’ protests.

He joined KUD Idijoti in 1985, four years after the band's formation, and due to his charisma, stage persona and sincere anti-fascist convictions he soon became one of the best known and most important punk singers in former Yugoslavia. He participated in numerous concerts throughout former Yugoslavia and abroad. His last performance took place in Zeleni gaj in Slovenia, on 26 February 2011.

Branko Črnac Tusta died following complications from throat cancer on 14 October 2012. He was buried at the City cemetery in Pula.

Discography
Being the frontman of KUD Idijoti, Tusta participated in the recording of all the band's albums:
 Legendarni uživo (Legendary Live) (1986)
 Bolje izdati ploču nego prijatelja (Better Play Punk Than Be A Skunk) (1987)
 Lutke na koncu (String-Puppets) (1987)
 Hoćemo cenzuru (We Want Censorship) (1988)
 Live in Biel (1988)
 Bolivija R’n’R (Bolivia R’n’R) (1989)
 Mi smo ovdje samo zbog para (We In It Just For The Money) (1990)
 Đuro voz sold aut (Đuro Was Sold Out) (1991)
 Glupost je neuništiva (Stupidity Is Indestructible) (1992)
 Tako je govorio ZaraTusta (Thus Spoke ZaraTusta) (1993)
 Istra ti materina (1995)
 Megapank (Megapunk) (1995)
 Fuck (1996)
 Single collection vol. 1 (1997)
 Cijena ponosa (Price Of Pride) (1997)
 Gratis hits live! (Free Hit Songs Live!) (1999)
 Remek-djelo (The Masterpiece) (2001)

Honours
On the second anniversary of his death, one street in Pula was named after him, the stairwell that leads to the Uljanik rock-club, one of the main meeting-points for local alternative musicians.

Director Andrej Korovljev has made a documentary about Tusta's life and work.

Quotations
 Hundreds of examples have made me even more convinced that the title of the album "Stupidity is Indestructible" was perfectly correct. It is just that, in the meantime, I have become more tolerant towards stupidity and I accept it as a part of human existence. People have the right to be stupid, it cannot be abolished by decree. Aside from that, there are worse things: egoism, malice, sadism, terrorism, for example, it’s quite a long list... It doesn’t mean there are no smart people, good ideas, ingenious deeds and healthy things in this world. There are, of course, but when it comes to stupidity – it is something very hard to uproot.
 I have come to the realisation that political change can only be achieved by political means and political work, not by singing. Each activity has its own implements. You plough with a plough, you fight a war with a gun, you carry out restrictions with laws. Songs against war do not stop wars, singing about poverty doesn’t enrich the poor (perhaps the author of the song, ha, ha), songs about corruption do not prevent corruption. So, what do songs resolve? Nothing, for the most part.

References

External links
 Official web-page of KUD Idijoti

20th-century Croatian male singers
Yugoslav male singers
21st-century Croatian male singers
Croatian rock singers
Punk rock singers
1955 births
2012 deaths
People from Pula